The Mutilated Coin Redemption Program is a program of the United States Mint that allows holders of damaged United States coins to exchange them for usable money.

Some clients redeem large quantities (tons) of coins that are recovered from scrapping, vehicle recycling, and car shredding operations overseas.

The large volume and a growth of that volume suggested possible vulnerabilities in the program. Counterfeit mutilated coins could be redeemed for real money. A high percentage of undamaged coins suggested the possibility that the program could be misused for money laundering. Silver coins were absent (as required), and the percentages of pennies and nickels was low (suggesting local melting rather than redemption).

Dramatic accusations were made. Controversy arose when accusations turned out to be incorrect, unproven, or even in contradiction of reports made before the accusations. The Mint shut down the program for two years. Clarifications were made. Resumption was announced on January 23, 2018.

References

External links
Mutilated Coin Redemption Program | U.S. Mint
Mutilated Currency and Bent or Partial Coin - Federal Reserve Bank services
Contaminated Currency and Coin - Federal Reserve Bank services

Coins of the United States
United States Mint